Wang Jiayue (born April 14, 1988 in Harbin, Heilongjiang) is a Chinese ice dancer. With former partner  Meng Fei, she is the 2006 Chinese bronze medalist. They placed 12th at the 2005 Four Continents Championships. Their partnership ended in 2006.

She teamed up with Gao Chongbo in 2008. They placed 9th at the 2009 Four Continents Championships

Competitive highlights
(with Gao)

(with Meng)

References

 
 

1988 births
Living people
Chinese female ice dancers
Figure skaters from Harbin